"Waves" is a song recorded by American country music artist Luke Bryan, it was released as the fifth single on April 12, 2021, from the deluxe version of his seventh studio album Born Here Live Here Die Here. The song was written by Chase McGill, Ryan Hurd and Zach Crowell, and produced by Jeff Stevens and Jody Stevens. “Waves” was certified “Gold” July 2022, crossing 500,000 units sold.

Content
In a press release, Bryan explained: "'Waves' is a song about kids falling in love during the summer and just all the images and everything about how beautiful that summer love is and how the emotions just keep coming in waves, 'Waves' is kind of a play on words, and I fell in love with the song the second I heard it."

Critical reception
Billy Dukes of Taste of Country called "Waves" a serious romance song with a more creative melody than Bryan's previous single "Sunrise, Sunburn, Sunset", which was also written by McGill, Hurd and Crowell.

Music video
The music video was released on April 9, 2021, directed by Dano Cerny. It was filmed on the beach in Malibu, California.

Live performance
On May 16, 2021, Bryan performed the song on American Idol, on which he serves as a judge.

Charts

Weekly charts

Year-end charts

Certifications

References

2021 singles
2021 songs
Luke Bryan songs
Songs written by Zach Crowell
Songs written by Ryan Hurd
Songs written by Chase McGill
Capitol Records Nashville singles